Allied war crimes include both alleged and legally proven violations of the laws of war by the Allies of World War II against either civilians or military personnel of the Axis powers. At the end of World War II, many trials of Axis war criminals took place, most famously the Nuremberg Trials and Tokyo Trials. In Europe, these tribunals were set up under the authority of the London Charter, which only considered allegations of war crimes committed by people who acted in the interests of the Axis powers. Some war crimes involving Allied personnel were investigated by the Allied powers and led in some instances to courts-martial. Some incidents alleged by historians to have been crimes under the law of war in operation at the time were, for a variety of reasons, not investigated by the Allied powers during the war, or were investigated but not prosecuted.

According to an article in Der Spiegel by Klaus Wiegrefe, many personal memoirs of Allied soldiers have been willfully ignored by historians because they were at odds with the "greatest generation" mythology surrounding World War II. This has started to change, with books such as The Day of Battle by Rick Atkinson, in which he describes Allied war crimes in Italy, and D-Day: The Battle for Normandy, by Antony Beevor. Beevor's latest work suggests that Allied war crimes in Normandy were much more extensive "than was previously realized".

Policy
The Allies claim that their militaries were directed to observe the Hague Conventions and Geneva Conventions and believed to be conducting a just war fought for defensive reasons.  Violations of the conventions did occur, however, including the forcible return of Soviet citizens who had been collaborating with Axis forces to the USSR at the end of the war. The military of the Soviet Union also frequently committed war crimes, which are today known to have been at the direction of its government. These crimes included waging wars of aggression and mass killings of prisoners of war, and repressing the population of conquered countries.

Antony Beevor describes the Soviet rape of German women during the occupation of Germany as the "greatest phenomenon of mass rape in history", and has estimated that at least 1.4 million women were raped in East Prussia, Pomerania, and Silesia alone. He asserts that Soviet women and girls liberated from slave labor in Germany were also violated.

Individual commentators such as the German historian and left-wing antiwar activist Jörg Friedrich have argued that Allied aerial bombardment of civilian areas and cultural targets in enemy territory, including the German cities of Cologne, Hamburg, and Dresden, the Abbey in Monte Cassino in Italy during the Battle of Monte Cassino, the Japanese cities of Tokyo, Nagoya, Osaka, and especially the use of atomic bombs on Hiroshima and Nagasaki, which resulted in the total destruction of cities and the deaths of hundreds of thousands of civilians, should be considered war crimes; however, other observers point out that no positive or specific international law with respect to aerial warfare existed prior to and during World War II and that no Japanese and German officers were prosecuted at the post-World War II Allied war crime trials for the aerial raids on Shanghai, Chongqing, Warsaw, Rotterdam, and British cities during the Blitz.

Western Allies

Canada

Charles P. Stacey, the Canadian official campaign historian, reports that on 14 April 1945 rumours spread that the popular commanding officer of the Argyll and Sutherland Highlanders of Canada, Lieutenant Colonel Frederick E. Wigle, had been killed by a civilian sniper. This rumour resulted in the Highlanders setting fire to civilian property in the town of Friesoythe in an act of reprisal. Stacey later wrote that the Canadian troops first removed German civilians from their property before setting the houses on fire; he commented that he was "glad to say that [he] never heard of another such case". It was later found that German soldiers had killed the Argylls' commander.

According to Mitcham and von Stauffenberg, the Canadian army unit "The Loyal Edmonton Regiment" murdered German prisoners of war during the Invasion of Sicily.

France

French Army 

During the German invasion of Belgium, Belgian authorities arrested a number of suspects ("enemy Belgians and enemy foreigners") between 10 and 15 May on the orders of the auditor general Walter Ganshof van der Meersch. "It is clear that the arrests were very irresponsible and arbitrary. They just picked up some people: out of revenge, out of jealousy, because of their political beliefs, their Jewish origin or because of their foreign nationality," wrote survivor Gaby Warris.

Three days later, on 19 May, 79 of these detainees were taken to Abbeville and locked up under the music kiosk on the market square. When the city of Abbeville was heavily bombed from the air by German squadrons on the night of 19 to 20 May, the French guards feared the prisoners would be released by the Germans and decided to summarily execute them. Twenty-one prisoners were taken from the kiosk, placed against the wall, and shot without trial on the orders of the French Capitaine Marcel Dingeon, who was Abbeville's deputy commander. Of the dead, only four were found to have actually worked for the Germans. After the surrender of France, Dingeon killed himself several months after France surrendered. In January 1942, two French soldiers who participated in the massacre, Lieutenant René Caron and Sergeant Émile Molet, were tried by a German court-martial in wartime Paris. They were sentenced to death and executed on 7 April 1942 at Mont-Valérien.

Maquis
Following the Operation Dragoon landings in southern France and the collapse of the German military occupation in August 1944, large numbers of German troops could not escape from France and surrendered to the French Forces of the Interior. The Resistance executed a few of the Wehrmacht and most of the Gestapo and SS prisoners.

The Maquis also executed 17 German prisoners of war at Saint-Julien-de-Crempse (in the Dordogne region), on 10 September 1944, 14 of whom have since been positively identified. The murders were revenge killings for German murders of 17 local inhabitants of the village of St. Julien on 3 August 1944, which were themselves reprisal killings in response to Resistance activity in the St. Julien region, which was home to an active Maquis cell.

Moroccan Goumiers

French Moroccan troops of the French Expeditionary Corps, known as Goumiers, committed mass crimes in Italy during and after the Battle of Monte Cassino and in Germany. According to Italian sources, more than 12,000 civilians, above all young and old women, children, were kidnapped, raped, or killed by Goumiers. This is featured in the Italian film La Ciociara (Two Women) with Sophia Loren.

French troops took part in the invasion of Germany, and France was assigned an occupation zone in Germany. Perry Biddiscombe quotes the original survey estimates that the French Goumiers for instance committed "385 rapes in the Constance area; 600 in Bruchsal; and 500 in Freudenstadt." The soldiers are also alleged to have committed widespread rape in the Höfingen District near Leonberg. Katz and Kaiser, though they mention rape, found no specific occurrences in either Höfingen or Leonberg compared to other towns.
Anthony Clayton, in his book France, Soldiers, and Africa, devotes several pages to the criminal activities of the Goumiers, which he partially ascribes to typical practices in their homeland.

According to Norman Naimark, French Moroccan troops matched the behaviour of Soviet troops when it came to rape, in particular in the early occupation of Baden and Württemberg, provided the numbers are correct.

United Kingdom

The British, with other allied nations (mainly the U.S.) carried out air raids against enemy cities during World War II, including the bombing of the German city of Dresden, which killed around 25,000 people. While "no agreement, treaty, convention or any other instrument governing the protection of the civilian population or civilian property" from aerial attack was adopted before the war, the Hague Conventions did prohibit the bombardment of undefended towns. The city, largely untouched by the war had functioning rail communications to the Eastern front and was an industrial centre. Allied forces inquiry concluded that an air attack on Dresden was militarily justified on the grounds the city was defended.

After the end of the war in Europe, German prisoners in Norway were reportedly forced to clear minefields under British supervision. The Germans complained to British Commander, general Andrew Thorn, but he dismissed the accusations arguing that the Germans prisoners were not POWs but "disarmed forces who had surrendered unconditionally." By 1946, when the cleanup ended, 392 were injured and 275 had died; this was contrary to the terms of the Geneva Conventions.

On 4 May 1940, in response to Germany's intensive unrestricted submarine warfare, during the Battle of the Atlantic and its invasion of Denmark and Norway, the Royal Navy conducted its own unrestricted submarine campaign. The Admiralty announced that all vessels in the Skagerrak were to be sunk on sight without warning. This was contrary to the terms of the Second London Naval Treaty.

In July 1941, the submarine HMS Torbay (under the command of Anthony Miers) was based in the Mediterranean where it sank several German ships. On two occasions, once off the coast of Alexandria, Egypt, and the other off the coast of Crete, the crew attacked and killed dozens of shipwrecked German sailors and troops. None of the shipwrecked survivors posed a major threat to Torbay's crew. Miers made no attempt to hide his actions, and reported them in his official logs. He received a strongly worded reprimand from his superiors following the first incident. Miers' actions violated the Hague Convention of 1907, which banned the killing of shipwreck survivors under any circumstances.

On 10 September 1942, the Italian hospital ship Arno was torpedoed and sunk by RAF torpedo bombers north-east of Ras el Tin, near Tobruk. The British claimed that a decoded German radio message intimated that the vessel was carrying supplies to the Axis troops. Arno was the third Italian hospital ship sunk by British aircraft after the loss of the Po in the Adriatic Sea to aerial torpedoes on 14 March 1941 and the bombing of the California off Syracuse on 11 August 1942.

On 18 November 1944, the German hospital ship Tübingen was sunk by two Beaufighter bombers off Pola, in the Adriatic Sea. The vessel had paid a brief visit to the allied-controlled port of Bari to pick up German wounded under the auspices of the Red Cross; despite the calm sea and the good weather that allowed a clear identification of the ship's Red Cross markings, it was attacked with rockets nine times. Six crewmembers were killed. American author Alfred M. de Zayas, who evaluated the 266 extant volumes of the Wehrmacht War Crimes Bureau, identifies the sinking of Tübingen and other German hospital ships as war crimes.

During Operation Overlord, British line of communication troops conducted small-scale looting in Bayeux and Caen in France, following their liberation, in violation of the Hague Conventions.  Looting, rape, and prisoner executions were committed by British soldiers in a smaller scale than other armies throughout the war.  On 23 May 1945, British troops in Schleswig-Holstein were alleged to have plundered Glücksburg castle, stealing jewellery, and desecrating 38 coffins from the castle's mausoleum.

On 21 April 1945, British soldiers randomly selected and burned two cottages in Seedorf, Germany, in reprisal against local civilians who had hidden German soldiers in their cellars. Historian Sean Longden claims that violence against German prisoners and civilians who refused to cooperate with the British army "could be ignored or made light of".

The "London Cage", a MI19 prisoner of war facility in the UK during and immediately after the war, was subject to allegations of torture. The Bad Nenndorf interrogation centre in occupied Germany, managed by the Combined Services Detailed Interrogation Centre, was the subject of an official inquiry in 1947, which found that there was "mental and physical torture during the interrogations" and that "personal property of the prisoners were stolen".

The Italian statistics record eight rapes and nineteen attempted rapes by British soldiers in Italy between September 1943 and December 1945. Various sources, including the Special Investigation Branch as well as evidences from Belgian reporters, said that rape and sexual harassment by British troops occurred frequently following the invasion of Sicily in 1943.

In Germany, rapes of local women were committed by British and Canadian troops. Even elderly women were targeted. Though the Royal Military Police tended to turn a blind eye towards abuse of German prisoners and civilians who obstructed the army, rape was considered differently. Some officers, however, treated the behavior of their men with leniency. Some rapes were impulsively committed under the effects of alcohol or post-traumatic stress, but there were cases of premeditated attacks, such as the rape of three German women in the town of Neustadt am Rübenberge, or the attempted rape of two local girls at gunpoint in the village of Oyle, near Nienburg, where two soldiers attempted to coerce two girls into going into a nearby wood. When they refused, one was grabbed and dragged into the woods. When the girl began to scream, according to Longden, "one of the soldiers pulled a gun to silence her. Whether intentionally or in error, the gun went off, hitting her in the throat and killing her."

Rape also took place during the British advance towards Germany. During late 1944, with the army based across Belgium and the Netherlands, soldiers were billeted with local families or befriended them. In December 1944, it came to the attention of the authorities that there was a "rise of indecency with children" where abusers had exploited the "atmosphere of trust" that had been created with local families. While the army "attempted to investigate allegations, and some men were convicted, it was an issue that received little publicity."

United States 

 Laconia incident: US aircraft attacking Germans rescuing the sinking British troopship in the Atlantic Ocean. For example, the pilots of a United States Army Air Forces (USAAF) B-24 Liberator bomber, despite knowing the U-boat's location, intentions, and the presence of British seamen, killed dozens of Laconia's survivors with bombs and strafing attacks, forcing U-156 to cast their remaining survivors into the sea and crash dive to avoid being destroyed.
 Unrestricted submarine warfare. Fleet Admiral Nimitz, the wartime commander-in-chief of the U.S. Pacific Fleet, provided unapologetic written testimony on Karl Dönitz's behalf at his trial that the U.S. Navy had waged unrestricted submarine warfare in the Pacific from the very first day the U.S. entered the war.
 Canicattì massacre: killing of Italian civilians by Lieutenant Colonel McCaffrey. A confidential inquiry was made, but McCaffrey was never charged with an offense relating to the incident. He died in 1954. This incident remained virtually unknown until Joseph S. Salemi of New York University, whose father witnessed it, publicized it.
 In the Biscari massacre, which consists of two instances of mass murders, US troops of the 45th Infantry Division killed roughly 75 prisoners of war, mostly Italian.
 Near the French village of Audouville-la-Hubert, 30 German Wehrmacht prisoners were killed by U.S. paratroopers.
 In the aftermath of the Malmedy massacre, a written order from the HQ of the 328th US Army Infantry Regiment, dated 21 December 1944, stated: No SS troops or paratroopers will be taken prisoner but will be shot on sight. Major-General Raymond Hufft (US Army) gave instructions to his troops not to take prisoners when they crossed the Rhine in 1945. "After the war, when he reflected on the war crimes he authorized, he admitted, 'if the Germans had won, I would have been on trial at Nuremberg instead of them.'" Stephen Ambrose related: "I've interviewed well over 1000 combat veterans. Only one of them said he shot a prisoner ... Perhaps as many as one-third of the veterans ... however, related incidents in which they saw other GIs shooting unarmed German prisoners who had their hands up."
 Chenogne massacre: On 1 January 1945, members of the 11th Armored Division executed 80 Wehrmacht soldiers.
 Jungholzhausen massacre: On 15 April 1945, the 254th Infantry Regiment of the 63rd Infantry Division executed between 13 and 30 Waffen SS and Wehrmacht prisoners of war.
 Treseburg massacre: On 19 April 1945, the 18th Infantry Regiment of the 1st Infantry Division captured and murdered 9 unarmed Hitler Youths near the village of Treseburg.
 Lippach massacre: On 22 April 1945 American soldiers from the 23rd Tank Battalion of the 12th Armored Division killed 24 Waffen SS soldiers who had been taken prisoners of war in the German town of Lippach. Members of the same unit are also alleged to have raped 20 women in the town.
 The Dachau liberation reprisals: Upon the liberation of Dachau concentration camp on 29 April 1945, about a dozen guards in the camp were shot by a machine gunner who was guarding them. Other soldiers of the 3rd Battalion, 157th Infantry Regiment, of the US 45th (Thunderbird) Division killed other guards who resisted. In all, about 30 were killed, according to the commanding officer Felix L. Sparks. Later, Colonel Howard Buechner wrote that more than 500 were killed.
 Operation Teardrop: Eight of the surviving, captured crewmen from the sunken German submarine U-546 were tortured by US military personnel. Historian Philip K. Lundeberg has written that the beating and torture of U-546's survivors was a singular atrocity motivated by the interrogators' desire to quickly get information on what the U.S. believed were potential V-1 flying bombs or V-2 rocket attacks on the continental US by German submarines.
 Historian Peter Lieb has found that many U.S. and Canadian units were ordered not to take enemy prisoners during the D-Day landings in Normandy. If this view is correct, it may explain the fate of 64 German prisoners (out of the 130 captured) who did not make it to the POW collecting point on Omaha Beach on the day of the landings.
 During the Allied invasion in Sicily, some massacres of civilians by US troops were reported, including the Vittoria one, where 12 Italians died (including a 17-year-old boy), and in Piano Stella, where a group of peasants was murdered.

According to an article in Der Spiegel by Klaus Wiegrefe, many personal memoirs of Allied soldiers have been wilfully ignored by historians until now because they were at odds with the "greatest generation" mythology surrounding World War II. However, this has recently started to change, with books such as The Day of Battle, by Rick Atkinson, in which he describes Allied war crimes in Italy, and D-Day: The Battle for Normandy, by Antony Beevor. Beevor's latest work suggests that Allied war crimes in Normandy were much more extensive "than was previously realized".

Among American WWII veterans who admitted to having committed war crimes was former Mafia hitman Frank Sheeran. In interviews with his biographer Charles Brandt, Sheeran recalled his war service with the Thunderbird Division as the time when he first developed a callousness to the taking of human life. By his own admission, Sheeran participated in numerous massacres and summary executions of German POWs, acts which violated the Hague Conventions of 1899 and 1907 and the 1929 Geneva Convention on POWs. In his interviews with Brandt, Sheeran divided such massacres into four different categories.
 Revenge killings in the heat of battle. Sheeran told Brandt that, when a German soldier had just killed his close friends and then tried to surrender, he would often "send him to hell, too." He described often witnessing similar behavior by fellow GIs.
 Orders from unit commanders during a mission. When describing his first murder for organized crime, Sheeran recalled: "It was just like when an officer would tell you to take a couple of German prisoners back behind the line and for you to 'hurry back'. You did what you had to do."
 The Dachau massacre and other reprisal killings of concentration camp guards and trustee inmates.
 Calculated attempts to dehumanize and degrade German POWs. While Sheeran's unit was climbing the Harz Mountains, they came upon a Wehrmacht mule train carrying food and drink up the mountainside. The female cooks were first allowed to leave unmolested, then Sheeran and his fellow GIs "ate what we wanted and soiled the rest with our waste." Then the Wehrmacht mule drivers were given shovels and ordered to "dig their own shallow graves." Sheeran later joked that they did so without complaint, likely hoping that he and his buddies would change their minds. But the mule drivers were shot and buried in the holes they had dug. Sheeran explained that by then, "I had no hesitation in doing what I had to do."

War rape

Secret wartime files made public only in 2006 reveal that American GIs committed more than 400 sexual offenses in Europe, including 126 rapes in England, between 1942 and 1945. A study by Robert J. Lilly estimates that a total of 14,000 civilian women in England, France and Germany were raped by American GIs during World War II. It is estimated that there were around 3,500 rapes by American servicemen in France between June 1944 and the end of the war and one historian has claimed that sexual violence against women in liberated France was common.

In Taken by Force, J. Robert Lilly estimates the number of rapes committed by U.S. servicemen in Germany to be 11,040. As in the case of the American occupation of France after the D-Day invasion, many of the American rapes in Germany in 1945 were gang rapes committed by armed soldiers at gunpoint.

Although non-fraternization policies were instituted for the Americans in Germany, the phrase "copulation without conversation is not fraternization" was used as a motto by United States Army troops. The journalist Osmar White, a war correspondent from Australia who served with the American troops during the war, wrote that 

A typical victimization with sexual assault by drunken American personnel marching through occupied territory involved threatening a German family with weapons, forcing one or more women to engage in sex, and putting the entire family out on the street afterward.

As in the eastern sector of the occupation, the number of rapes peaked in 1945, but a high rate of violence against the German and Austrian populations by the Americans lasted at least into the first half of 1946, with five cases of dead German women found in American barracks in May and June 1946 alone.

Carol Huntington writes that the American soldiers who raped German women and then left gifts of food for them may have permitted themselves to view the act as a prostitution rather than rape. Citing the work of a Japanese historian alongside this suggestion, Huntington writes that Japanese women who begged for food "were raped and soldiers sometimes left food for those they raped."

The black soldiers of America's segregated occupation force were both more likely to be charged with rape and severely punished. Heide Fehrenbach writes that, while the American black soldiers were in fact by no means free from indiscipline, 

In 2015, German news magazine Der Spiegel reported that German historian Miriam Gebhardt "believes that members of the US military raped as many as 190,000 German women by the time West Germany regained sovereignty in 1955, with most of the assaults taking place in the months immediately following the US invasion of Nazi Germany. The author bases her claims in large part on reports kept by Bavarian priests in the summer of 1945."

Eastern Allies

Soviet Union 

The Soviet Union had not signed the Geneva Convention of 1929 that protected, and stated how prisoners of war should be treated. This cast doubt on whether the Soviet treatment of Axis prisoners was therefore a war crime, although prisoners "were [not] treated even remotely in accordance with the Geneva Convention", resulting in the deaths of hundreds of thousands. However, the Nuremberg Tribunal rejected this as a general argument. The tribunal held that the Hague Conventions (which the 1929 Geneva Convention did not replace but only augmented, and unlike the 1929 convention, were ones that the Russian Empire had ratified) and other customary laws of war, regarding the treatment of prisoners of war, were binding on all nations in a conflict whether they were signatories to the specific treaty or not.

One of the Soviet Union's earliest war crimes was the Katyn massacre (Polish: zbrodnia katyńska, "Katyń crime"; Russian: Катынская резня Katynskaya reznya, "Katyn massacre", or Russian: Катынский расстрел, "Katyn execution by shooting"), a series of mass executions of Polish military officers and intelligentsia  carried out by the Soviet Union, specifically the NKVD ("People's Commissariat for Internal Affairs", aka the Soviet secret police) in April and May 1940. Though the killings took place at several places, the massacre is named after the Katyn Forest, where some of the mass graves were first discovered.

Acts of mass rape and other war crimes were committed by Soviet troops during the occupation of East Prussia (Danzig), parts of Pomerania and Silesia, during the Battle of Berlin, and during the Battle of Budapest.

The most widely-known war crimes committed by Soviet troops against citizens and soldiers are:
 the Metgethen massacre: mass murder and rape of German citizens by Red Army soldiers
 the Nemmersdorf massacre: mass murder and rape of German citizens by the Soviet Red Army
 the Treuenbritzen massacre: mass murder and rape of German citizens by Soviet soldiers
 the Massacre of Broniki: murder of German POWs by Soviet soldiers
 the Massacre of Grischino: torture and murder of prisoners by Soviet soldiers and the NKVD
 the Massacre of Feodosia: the torture and murder of 160 wounded German soldiers by the Red Army and Soviet Navy
 the Naliboki massacre: the mass murder of 129 Polish civilians by Soviet Partisans and Nationalist Guerrillas

Late in the war, Yugoslavia's communist partisans complained about the rapes and looting committed by the Soviet Army while traversing their country. Milovan Djilas later recalled Joseph Stalin's response,

Does Djilas, who is himself a writer, not know what human suffering and the human heart are? Can't he understand it if a soldier who has crossed thousands of kilometers through blood and fire and death has fun with a woman or takes some trifle?

Soviet war correspondent Natalya Gesse observed the Red Army in 1945: "The Russian soldiers were raping every German female from eight to eighty. It was an army of rapists". Polish women as well as Russian, Belorussian and Ukrainian slave laborers were also mass raped by the Red Army. The Soviet war correspondent Vasily Grossman described: "Liberated Soviet girls quite often complain that our soldiers rape them".

The Gegenmiao massacre of 1945; rapes and massacres conducted by the Soviet Army over half a group of 1,800 Japanese women and children who had taken refuge in the lamasery Gegenmiao/Koken-miao (葛根廟) during the Soviet invasion of Manchuria.

Yugoslavia

Asia and the Pacific War

Allied soldiers in the Pacific and Asian theatres sometimes killed Japanese soldiers who were attempting to surrender or after they had surrendered. A social historian of the Pacific War, John W. Dower, states that "by the final years of the war against Japan, a truly vicious cycle had developed in which the Japanese reluctance to surrender had meshed horrifically with Allied disinterest in taking prisoners". Dower suggests that most Japanese personnel were told that they would be "killed or tortured" if they fell into Allied hands and, as a consequence, most of those faced with defeat on the battlefield fought to the death or committed suicide. In addition, it was held to be shamefully disgraceful for a Japanese soldier to surrender, leading many to commit suicide or to fight to the death regardless of any beliefs concerning their possible treatment as POWs. In fact, the Japanese Field Service Code said that surrender was not permissible.

And while it was "not official policy" for Allied personnel to take no prisoners, "over wide reaches of the Asian battleground it was everyday practice".

Australia
According to historian Mark Johnston, "the killing of unarmed Japanese was common" and Australian command tried to put pressure on troops to actually take prisoners, but the troops proved reluctant. When prisoners were indeed taken "it often proved difficult to prevent them from killing captured Japanese before they could be interrogated".  According to Johnston, as a consequence of this type of behavior, "Some Japanese soldiers were almost certainly deterred from surrendering to Australians".

Major General Paul Cullen indicated that the killing of Japanese prisoners in the Kokoda Track Campaign was not uncommon. In one instance he recalled during the battle at Gorari that "the leading platoon captured five or seven Japanese and moved on to the next battle. The next platoon came along and bayoneted these Japanese." He also stated that he found the killings understandable but that it had left him feeling guilty.

China 

There has been relatively little research into the general treatment of Japanese prisoners taken by Chinese Nationalist forces, such as the National Revolutionary Army (NRA), during the Second Sino-Japanese War (1937–45), according to R. J. Rummel. However, civilians and conscripts, as well as Japanese civilians in China, were frequently maltreated by the Chinese military. Rummel says that Chinese peasants "often had no less to fear from their own soldiers than ... from the Japanese". The Nationalist military was reinforced by recruits gained through violent campaigns of conscription directed at Chinese civilians. According to Rummel:

This was a deadly affair in which men were kidnapped for the army, rounded up indiscriminately by press-gangs or army units among those on the roads or in the towns and villages, or otherwise gathered together. Many men, some the very young and old, were killed resisting or trying to escape. Once collected, they would be roped or chained together and marched, with little food or water, long distances to camp. They often died or were killed along the way, sometimes less than 50 percent reaching camp alive. Then recruit camp was no better, with hospitals resembling Nazi concentration camps... Probably 3,081,000 died during the Sino-Japanese War; likely another 1,131,000 during the Civil War—4,212,000 dead in total. Just during conscription [emphasis added].

Within some intakes of Nationalist conscripts, there was a death rate of 90% from disease, starvation or violence before they commenced training.

Examples of war crimes committed by Chinese associated forces include:
 in 1937 near Shanghai, the killing, torture and assault of Japanese POWs and Chinese civilians accused of collaboration, were recorded in photographs taken by Swiss businessman Tom Simmen. In 1996, Simmen's son released the pictures, showing Nationalist Chinese soldiers committing summary executions by decapitation and shooting, as well as public torture.
 the Yan'an Rectification Movement; from 1942 to 1945 in the Communist-controlled zones, ordered by Mao Zedong and the Chinese Communist Party. Over 10,000 people were tortured or killed and it is often regarded by many as the beginning of Mao Zedong's cult of personality.
 the Tungchow Mutiny of August 1937; Chinese soldiers recruited by Japan mutinied and switched sides in Tōngzhōu, Beijing, before attacking Japanese civilians, killing 280 and raping many women.
 Nationalist troops in Hubei Province, during May 1943, ordered whole towns to evacuate and then "plundered" them; any civilians who refused or were unable to leave, were killed.

United Kingdom
During the Burma Campaign, there are recorded instances of British troops removing gold teeth from dead Japanese troops and displaying Japanese skulls as trophies.

During the Allied occupation of Japan, Australian, British, Indian and New Zealand troops in Japan as part of the British Commonwealth Occupation Force (BCOF) committed 62 recorded rapes. The commander of the BCOF's official reports state that members of the BCOF were convicted of committing 57 rapes in the period May 1946 to December 1947 and a further 23 between January 1948 and September 1951. No official statistics on the incidence of serious crimes during the BCOF's first three months in Japan (February to April 1946) are available. Australian historian Robin Gerster contends that while the official statistics underestimate the level of serious crime among BCOF members, Japanese police often did not pass reports they received on to the BCOF and that the serious crimes which were reported were properly investigated by BCOF military police. The penalties given to members of the BCOF convicted of serious crimes were "not severe", however, and those imposed on Australians were often mitigated or quashed by Australian courts.

United States

On January 26, 1943, the submarine USS Wahoo fired on survivors in lifeboats from the Japanese transport Buyo Maru. Vice Admiral Charles A. Lockwood asserted that the survivors were Japanese soldiers who had turned machine-gun and rifle fire on the Wahoo after she surfaced, and that such resistance was common in submarine warfare. According to the submarine's executive officer, the fire was intended to force the Japanese soldiers to abandon their boats and none of them were deliberately targeted. Historian Clay Blair stated that the submarine's crew fired first and the shipwrecked survivors returned fire with handguns. The survivors were later determined to have included Allied POWs of the Indian 2nd Battalion, 16th Punjab Regiment, who were guarded by Japanese Army Forces from the 26th Field Ordnance Depot. Of 1,126 men originally aboard Buyo Maru, 195 Indians and 87 Japanese died, some killed during the torpedoing of the ship and some killed by the shootings afterwards.

On 4 March 1943, during and after the Battle of the Bismarck Sea (March 3–5, 1943), General George Kenney ordered U.S. patrol boats and Allied aircraft to attack Japanese rescue vessels, as well as the approximately 1,000 survivors from eight sunken Japanese troop transport ships on life rafts and swimming or floating in the sea. This was later State justified on the grounds that the rescued servicemen were next to their destination, and would have been rapidly landed at their military destination and promptly returned to active service in the battle. Many of the Allied aircrew accepted the attacks as necessary, while others were sickened.

American soldiers in the Pacific often deliberately killed Japanese soldiers who had surrendered. According to Richard Aldrich, a professor of history at the University of Nottingham. who has published a study of the diaries kept by United States and Australian soldiers, they sometimes massacred prisoners of war. Dower states that in "many instances ... Japanese who did become prisoners were killed on the spot or en route to prison compounds". According to Aldrich it was common practice for U.S. troops not to take prisoners. This analysis is supported by British historian Niall Ferguson, who also says that, in 1943, "a secret [U.S.] intelligence report noted that only the promise of ice cream and three days leave would ... induce American troops not to kill surrendering Japanese".

Ferguson states such practices played a role in the ratio of Japanese prisoners to dead being 1:100 in late 1944. That same year, efforts were taken by Allied high commanders to suppress "take no prisoners" attitudes, among their own personnel (as these were affecting intelligence gathering) and to encourage Japanese soldiers to surrender. Ferguson adds that measures by Allied commanders to improve the ratio of Japanese prisoners to Japanese dead, resulted in it reaching 1:7, by mid-1945. Nevertheless, taking no prisoners was still standard practice among US troops at the Battle of Okinawa, in April–June 1945. Ferguson also suggests that "it was not only the fear of disciplinary action or of dishonor that deterred German and Japanese soldiers from surrendering. More important for most soldiers was the perception that prisoners would be killed by the enemy anyway, and so one might as well fight on."

Ulrich Straus, a US Japanologist, suggests that frontline troops intensely hated Japanese military personnel and were "not easily persuaded" to take or protect prisoners, as they believed that Allied personnel who surrendered, got "no mercy" from the Japanese. Allied soldiers believed that Japanese soldiers were inclined to feign surrender in order to make surprise attacks, a practice which was outlawed by the Hague Convention of 1907. Therefore, according to Straus, "Senior officers opposed the taking of prisoners on the grounds that it needlessly exposed American troops to risks". When prisoners nevertheless were taken at Guadalcanal, interrogator Army Captain Burden noted that many times these were shot during transport because "it was too much bother to take him in".

US historian James J. Weingartner attributes the very low number of Japanese in US POW compounds to two important factors, a Japanese reluctance to surrender and a widespread American "conviction that the Japanese were "animals" or "subhuman" and unworthy of the normal treatment accorded to POWs. The latter reason is supported by Ferguson, who says that "Allied troops often saw the Japanese in the same way that Germans regarded Russians—as Untermenschen".

Mutilation of Japanese war dead

In the Pacific theater, Allied servicemen engaged in human trophy collecting from Japanese soldiers. The phenomenon of "trophy-taking" specially by American personnel occurred on "a scale large enough to concern the Allied military authorities throughout the conflict, and was widely reported and commented on in the American and Japanese wartime press", with magazines and journals reporting widespread cases. Franklin Roosevelt himself was reportedly given a gift of a letter-opener made of a Japanese soldier's arm by U.S. Representative Francis E. Walter in 1944, which Roosevelt later ordered to be returned, calling for its proper burial. The news was also widely reported to the Japanese public, where the Americans were portrayed as "deranged, primitive, racist and inhuman". This, compounded by a previous Life magazine picture of a young woman with a skull trophy, was reprinted in the Japanese media and presented as a symbol of "American barbarism", causing national shock and outrage.

The collection of Japanese body parts began quite early in the war, prompting a September 1942 order for disciplinary action against such souvenir taking. Harrison concludes that, since this was the first real opportunity to take such items (the Battle of Guadalcanal), "clearly, the collection of body parts on a scale large enough to concern the military authorities had started as soon as the first living or dead Japanese bodies were encountered".

When Japanese remains were repatriated from the Mariana Islands after the war, roughly 60 percent were missing their skulls.

In a 13 June 1944 memorandum, the US Army Judge Advocate General, (JAG) Major General Myron C. Cramer, asserted that "such atrocious and brutal policies", were both "repugnant to the sensibilities of all civilized people" and also violations of the Geneva Convention for the Amelioration of the Condition of the Wounded and Sick in Armies in the Field, which stated that: "After each engagement, the occupant of the field of battle shall take measures to search for the wounded and dead, and to protect them against pillage and maltreatment." Cramer recommended the distribution to all commanders of a directive ordering them to prohibit the misuse of enemy body parts.

These practices were in addition also in violation of the unwritten customary rules of land warfare and could lead to the death penalty. The US Navy JAG mirrored that opinion one week later, and also added that "the atrocious conduct of which some US personnel were guilty could lead to retaliation by the Japanese which would be justified under international law".

Okinawa
U.S. military personnel raped Okinawan women during the Battle of Okinawa in 1945.

Okinawan historian Oshiro Masayasu (former director of the Okinawa Prefectural Historical Archives) writes based on several years of research:

According to interviews carried out by The New York Times and published by them in 2000, several elderly people from an Okinawan village confessed that after the United States had won the Battle of Okinawa, three armed Marines kept coming to the village every week to force the villagers to gather all the local women, who were then carried off into the hills and raped. The article goes deeper into the matter and claims that the villagers' tale—true or not—is part of a "dark, long-kept secret" the unraveling of which "refocused attention on what historians say is one of the most widely ignored crimes of the war": 'the widespread rape of Okinawan women by American servicemen." Although Japanese reports of rape were largely ignored at the time, academic estimates have been that as many as 10,000 Okinawan women may have been raped. It has been claimed that the rape was so prevalent that most Okinawans over age 65 around the year 2000 either knew or had heard of a woman who was raped in the aftermath of the war. Military officials denied the mass rapings, and all surviving veterans refused The New York Times request for an interview.

Professor of East Asian Studies and expert on Okinawa, Steve Rabson, said: "I have read many accounts of such rapes in Okinawan newspapers and books, but few people know about them or are willing to talk about them." He notes that plenty of old local books, diaries, articles and other documents refer to rapes by American soldiers of various races and backgrounds.

An explanation given for why the US military has no record of any rapes is that few—if any—Okinawan women reported abuse, mostly out of fear and embarrassment. According to  Nago, Okinawan  police spokesman: "Victimized women feel too ashamed to make it public." Those who did report them are believed by historians to have been ignored by the U.S. military police. A large scale effort to determine the extent of such crimes has also never been called for. Over five decades after the war has ended the women who were believed to have been raped still refused to give a public statement, with friends, local historians and university professors who had spoken with the women instead saying they preferred not to discuss it publicly. Many people wondered why it never came to light after the inevitable American-Japanese babies the many women must have given birth to. In interviews, historians and Okinawan elders said that some of those Okinawan women who were raped and did not commit suicide did give birth to biracial children, but that many of them were immediately killed or left behind out of shame, disgust or fearful trauma. More often, however, rape victims underwent crude abortions with the help of village midwives. A large scale effort to determine the possible extent of these crimes has never been conducted. Over five decades after the war had ended, in the late 1990s, the women who were believed to have been raped still overwhelmingly refused to give public statements, instead speaking through relatives and a number of historians and scholars.

There is substantial evidence that the U.S. had at least some knowledge of what was going on. Samuel Saxton, a retired captain, explained that the American veterans and witnesses may have intentionally kept the rape a secret, largely out of shame: "It would be unfair for the public to get the impression that we were all a bunch of rapists after we worked so hard to serve our country." Military officials formally denied the mass rapes, and all surviving related veterans refused request for interviews from The New York Times. Masaie Ishihara, a sociology professor, supports this: "There is a lot of historical amnesia out there, many people don't want to acknowledge what really happened." Author George Feifer in his book Tennozan: The Battle of Okinawa and the Atomic Bomb, noted that by 1946 there had been fewer than 10 reported cases of rape in Okinawa. He explained that it was "partly because of shame and disgrace, partly because Americans were victors and occupiers". Feifer claimed: "In all there were probably thousands of incidents, but the victims' silence kept rape another dirty secret of the campaign."

However, American professor of Japanese studies Michael S. Molasky and some other authors have argued that they noted that Okinawan civilians "were often surprised at the comparatively humane treatment they received from the American enemy." According to Islands of Discontent: Okinawan Responses to Japanese and American Power by the American Mark Selden, the Americans "did not pursue a policy of torture, rape, and murder of civilians as Japanese military officials had warned."

Post-war

According to some authors, there were 1,336 reported rapes during the first 10 days of the occupation of Kanagawa Prefecture after the Japanese surrender, however author Brian Walsh states that this claim originates from a misreading of Japanese Government crime figures that had actually reported 1,326 criminal incidents of all types involving American forces, including an unspecified number of rapes.

Comparative death rates of POWs
According to James D. Morrow, "Death rates of POWs held is one measure of adherence to the standards of the treaties because substandard treatment leads to death of prisoners". The "democratic states generally provide good treatment of POWs".

Killed by the Allied powers
 German POWs in East European (not including the Soviet Union) hands 32.9%
 German soldiers held by Soviet Union: 15–33% (14.7% in The Dictators by Richard Overy, 35.8% in Ferguson)
 Italian soldiers held by the Soviet Union: 79%
 Japanese POWs held by Soviet Union: 10% 
 German POWs in British hands 0.03%
 German POWs in American hands 0.15%
 German POWs in French hands 2.58%
 Japanese POWs held by U.S.: relatively low, mainly suicides according to James D. Morrow.
 Japanese POWs in Chinese hands: 24%

Killed by Axis powers 
 US and British Commonwealth POWs held by Germany: ≈4%
 Soviet POWs held by Germany: 57.5%
 Italian POWs and military internees held by Germany: between 6% and 8.4%
 Western Allied POWs held by Japan: 27% (Figures for Japan may be misleading, as sources indicate that either 10,800 or 19,000 of 35,756 fatalities among Allied POW's were from "friendly fire" at sea when their transport ships were sunk.  The Geneva convention required the labelling of hospital ships as such, but had no provision for the labelling of such craft as POW ships. All sides killed many of their own POWs when sinking enemy ships.)

Summary table

Portrayal

Holocaust denial literature
The focus on supposed Allied atrocities during the war has been a theme of Holocaust denial literature, particularly in countries where outright denial of the Holocaust is illegal. According to historian Deborah Lipstadt, the concept of "comparable Allied wrongs", such as the post-war expulsions of ethnic Germans from Eastern Europe and Allied war crimes, is at the center of, and a continuously repeated theme of, contemporary Holocaust denial; phenomenon she calls "immoral equivalencies".

Japanese neo-nationalists
Japanese neo-nationalists argue that Allied war crimes and the shortcomings of the Tokyo War Crimes Tribunal were equivalent to the war crimes committed by Japanese forces during the war. American historian John W. Dower has written that this position is "a kind of historiographic cancellation of immorality—as if the transgressions of others exonerate one's own crimes". While right-wing forces in Japan have tried to push for their perspective on war-time history, they have been unsuccessful due to opposition both within and outside Japan.

See also

 German war crimes
 Italian war crimes
 Japanese war crimes
Allied war crimes
 Churchill's advocacy of chemical strike against German cities
 Poison laboratory of the Soviet secret services, which was involved in experiments on German and Japanese prisoners of war
 Communist purges in Serbia in 1944–1945
 Foibe massacres
 Thiaroye massacre
 Soviet partisans, atrocities against civilians in Finland
 Forced labour of Germans after World War II
 Forced labour of Germans in the Soviet Union
Other
 List of massacres
 Looted art
 Philosophy of history
 Taken by Force (book)
 Victor's justice

Notes

References

Citations

Sources 

 
 
 
 
 
 
  PhD dissertation.

Further reading
 Harris, Justin Michael. "American Soldiers and POW Killing in the European Theater of World War II" 

World War II crimes